The National Collegiate Athletic Association (NCAA) Division I Football Championship Subdivision (I FCS) includes 128 teams. Each team has one head coach. As of the upcoming 2023 season, Division I FCS is composed of 14 conferences: the ASUN–WAC Football Conference, Big Sky Conference, Big South Conference, Colonial Athletic Association (CAA), Ivy League, Mid-Eastern Athletic Conference (MEAC), Missouri Valley Football Conference (MVFC), Northeast Conference (NEC), Ohio Valley Conference (OVC), Patriot League, Pioneer Football League, Southern Conference (Southern, or SoCon), Southland Conference, and Southwestern Athletic Conference (SWAC). The ASUN–WAC, which plays its first season as a standalone conference in 2023, is a merger of the preexisting football leagues of the ASUN Conference and Western Athletic Conference, replacing a football alliance between the two conferences.

In the 2021 season, all schools including St. Thomas (MN) are members of one of these conferences. St. Thomas left Division III after its expulsion from the Minnesota Intercollegiate Athletic Conference, announced in 2019, took effect and joined the Pioneer Football League after successfully receiving a waiver for a direct move to Division I in 2020.

As of the start of the 2023 season, the longest-tenured coaches in Division I FCS are expected to be Kevin Callahan of Monmouth and Jim Parady of Marist, who have been head coaches at their respective schools since 1992. In all, 22 FCS programs had new head coaches in 2022.

Conference affiliations are current for the upcoming 2023 season. One future FCS team has hired its head coach; that team is indicated with a light blue background.

Coaches

See also
 List of current NCAA Division I FBS football coaches
 List of current NCAA Division I baseball coaches
 List of current NCAA Division I men's basketball coaches
 List of current NCAA Division I women's basketball coaches
 List of current NCAA Division I men's ice hockey coaches
 List of NCAA Division I men's soccer coaches

Notes

References

 

FCS coaches